Expo '67 Report was a Canadian news television series which aired on CBC Television in 1966.

Premise
This series was a preview of Expo 67, the World's Fair in Montreal featuring news and interviews relating to the progress on planning and development of the Expo site. People associated with the event from architects to dignitaries of participating nations were interviewed.

For example, the 20 July 1966 episode featured interviews with Montreal mayor Jean Drapeau and journalist Charles Lynch on their impressions of the development of Expo 67. A news item also reported that apartments with a view to the Expo site had monthly rents of $1500 compared to typical Montreal rents of $40 to $400 per month.

The CBC's international broadcast centre at Expo 67 was budgeted at $10 million.

Scheduling
This half-hour series was broadcast Tuesdays at 6:30 p.m. (Eastern) from 5 July to 6 September 1966.

References

External links
 

CBC Television original programming
1966 Canadian television series debuts
1966 Canadian television series endings
Expo 67